Jeffrey Lee Meikle (born July 2, 1949 in Columbus) is an American cultural historian and educator. Meikle is currently the Stiles Professor in American Studies Emeritus at the University of Texas at Austin. He has generally been credited as one of the founders of the discipline of design history since his publication "Ghosts in the Machine: Why It's Hard to Write about Design" was published in 2005. The text lays out some of the central issues confronting the field.

Career
Born to Wendell Alvin Meikle and Arlene Martha Carter in Columbus, Meikle initially attended the Thomas Jefferson School in St. Louis. He received both his Bachelor of Arts and Master of Arts in American Civilization from Brown University in 1971, graduating summa cum laude. Meikle wrote a thesis was titled "The Metaphysics of Technology: Entropy and Information as Metaphors of Society in Twentieth-Century America." He then continued on to the University of Texas at Austin, where he received a Doctor of Philosophy in American Studies in 1977. Meikle completed a dissertation titled "Technological Visions of American Industrial Designers, 1925-1939," under the supervision of William H. Goetzmann.

While a student in Austin, Meikle was an instructor at the school until graduating. He then moved to Colby–Sawyer College for one year to teach courses in American Studies. In 1979, Meikle returned to Texas and was hired as Assistant Professor of American Studies. He was promoted to Associate Professor in 1986, and then to full Professor in 1995. In 2011, the professorship was endowed as the Stiles Professor in American Studies. Eleven years later, Meikle retired from the post as Emeritus. Throughout his career, his research has focused on American studies and design history.

Works

 Twentieth Century Limited: Industrial Design in America, 1925-1939. Philadelphia: Temple University Press, 1979
 American Plastic:  A Cultural History. New Brunswick: Rutgers University Press, 1995
 Design in the USA. Oxford, England: Oxford University Press, 2005
 Postcard America: Curt Teich and the Imaging of a Nation, 1931-1950. Austin: University of Texas Press, 2015

See also
List of Brown University people
List of people from Columbus, Ohio
List of University of Texas at Austin alumni
List of University of Texas at Austin faculty

References

External links
University of Texas at Austin profile

1949 births
Living people
Writers from Columbus, Ohio
21st-century American historians
21st-century American male writers
American male non-fiction writers
Brown University alumni
University of Texas at Austin alumni
Colby–Sawyer College faculty
University of Texas at Austin faculty